The Military Civic Action Medal is a military decoration of the Armed Forces of the Philippines.  It is awarded for meritorious achievement in the conduct of humanitarian civic actions in direct support military operations.

Criteria
The Military Civic Action Medal is awarded to both military and civilian personnel of the Armed Forces of the Philippines.  It may also be awarded to foreign nationals from allied nations.  It is awarded for "...meritorious achievement in the field of civic action in duty responsibility or in direct support to military operations".

The medal may be awarded by the Chief of Staff of the Armed Forces of the Philippines, Area Commanders, Armed Forces of the Philippines-Wide Support and Separate Units, and the Commanders of the Philippine Army, Philippine Navy, or Philippine Air Force. Division and Brigade commanders, and their equivalents in the Philippine Air Force and Navy, may also award the medal.

Appearance
The medal is a golden colored disc, bearing the stylized image of a gear being held up by a pair of hands.  The disc is surrounded by a green wreath encircling the entire obverse.  Four rays emanate from behind the medal, pointing in the cardinal directions, overlapping the wreath.

The medal is suspended from a blue ribbon, with a central stripe of green, bordered on each side by equal stripes of white and red.

See also
 Awards and decorations of the Armed Forces of the Philippines

References

Citations

Bibliography
 The AFP Adjutant General, AFP Awards and Decorations Handbook, 1995, 1997, OTAG.

Military awards and decorations of the Philippines